Lost Land of the Tiger is a three-part nature documentary series produced by the BBC Natural History Unit which follows a scientific expedition to the Himalayan kingdom of Bhutan. The expedition team is made up of specialist zoologists, explorers and the BBC crew. Together, they explore wilderness areas from the lowland jungles to high-elevation slopes, in search of rare animals and plants. The focus of the expedition is to investigate the status of the tiger in Bhutan, where little is known of the cat's distribution or population density. Evidence of a healthy population of tigers would elevate Bhutan's importance as a sanctuary for this endangered species. It would also support tiger conservationist Dr. Alan Rabinowitz's proposal for a vast protected corridor linking the fragmented pockets of tiger habitat which lie to the south of the Himalayas.

The BBC footage shows a female tiger lactating and scent-marking, followed a few days later by a male tiger responding, suggesting that the cats could be breeding at this elevation. Previously, anecdotal sightings from Bhutanese mountain villagers suggested tigers were capable of visiting such heights, but it was not known whether they were living and breeding there. The footage was obtained using remote camera traps which are triggered by motion. This discovery dramatically increases the known range of viable tiger habitat. The camera traps also recorded footage of other rarely seen forest creatures, including Indian wild dogs, Asian elephants, leopards and leopard cats.

The series was broadcast on BBC One in the United Kingdom on three consecutive nights, starting on 21 September 2010. The presenters were Steve Backshall, Gordon Buchanan, Justine Evans and Dr. George McGavin.

Lost Land of the Tiger was the fourth of the BBC Natural History Unit's "Expedition" series, following Expedition Borneo (2006) and Lost Land of the Jaguar (2008) and Lost Land of the Volcano (2009).

See also
 Wildlife of Bhutan

References

External links

 Lost Land of The Tiger: Filming in Bhutan – BBC blog post by Gordon Buchanan

2010 British television series debuts
2010 British television series endings
BBC high definition shows
BBC television documentaries
Documentary films about nature
Films shot in Bhutan
Television series about tigers